Extended Versions is a 2003 live album by the Monkees recorded during their 35th Anniversary Tour in 2001. It features three of the original Monkees; Micky Dolenz, Davy Jones and Peter Tork. The CD-only album includes live versions of several of the band's hit songs including "Last Train to Clarksville", "Daydream Believer", and "I'm a Believer".

The album was released through BMG Special Products, which is a division of BMG that uses a third-party to make compilation albums. Because there are no standards of quality for the subsidy, Extended Versions is considered a budget CD.  The CD also does not contain liner notes.

Track listing

References

External links
 Amazon.com "The Monkees - Extended Versions" Retrieved 7 January 2013.

The Monkees live albums
2003 live albums